is a 1967 Japanese drama film directed by Mikio Naruse starring Yōko Tsukasa and Yūzō Kayama. It was Naruse's final film after a long lasting career which started in 1930.

Plot
Shortly before Yumiko's and her husband Hiroshi's (an employee of the Ministry of Economy) departure for the United States, he is killed in a car accident. Though acquitted in the following hearing, the car's driver Shiro feels guilty and offers Yumiko to pay a monthly instalment. Yumiko first rejects, but when her husband's family disowns her, leaving her without an inheritance, she finally accepts the money. Due to her precarious financial situation, she decides to return to her hometown and work in the inn run by her sister near Lake Towada. By coincidence, Shiro is reassigned by his employers to the same area. Although Yumiko and Shiro slowly develop a mutual affection, finally leading to a love affair, Yumiko can't leave her past behind, which returns with all its power when she witnesses an accident that reminds her of Hiroshi's death. In the end, Shiro is transferred again, to a far away office in Lahore, Pakistan.

Cast
Yōko Tsukasa as Yumiko 
Yūzō Kayama as Mishima Shiro
Mitsuko Kusabue as Ayako, Yumiko's sister
Mitsuko Mori as Katsuko, Yumiko's sister-in-law
Mie Hama as Teruko
Daisuke Katō as Hayashida
Yoshio Tsuchiya as Hiroshi, Yumiko's husband
Yū Fujiki as Ishikawa, Ayako's husband
Tadao Nakamaru as Fujiwara
Kumeko Urabe as Nui, Shiro's mother

Legacy
Scattered Clouds was presented in the Museum of Modern Art, New York, in 1987, with an introduction by noted film historian Donald Richie. In 2015, it was presented at the 39th Hong Kong International Film Festival as part of a retrospective on the director.

References

Bibliography

External links

1967 films
1967 drama films
1960s Japanese-language films
Japanese drama films
Films directed by Mikio Naruse
Toho films
1960s Japanese films